Kauri is a type of tree.

Kauri may also refer to:

 Kauri, New Zealand, a locality in Northland, New Zealand
 Kauri language, a variety of Jingpho
 Hans Kauri, Estonian biologist and politician

See also 
 Kauri-butanol value
 Kauri gum
 Kaure (disambiguation)
 Kouri (disambiguation)
 Kawri, a village in Syria